Richard Mbogo (born August 2, 1973) is a Tanzanian politician and a member of the Chama Cha Mapinduzi political party. He was elected MP representing Nsimbo in 2015.

References 

1973 births
Living people
Chama Cha Mapinduzi MPs
Members of the National Assembly (Tanzania)
Tanzanian MPs 2015–2020